Santiago Méndez Ibarra (1798 – 1872) was governor of Yucatán, Mexico 3 times from 1840 to 1857: 1840–44; 1847–48; 1855–57, alternating that office with Miguel Barbachano mainly during his first and second terms. Méndez was a moderate who advocated a strict conservative financial policy for the government. He was noted for his honesty, and gained no personal fortune from his years in governmental power. Santiago Méndez was more in favor of union with Mexico than Barbachano, but twice presided over Yucatán declaring its independence, due to frustration with Mexican dictator Antonio López de Santa Anna.

Santiago Méndez was father of Concepción Méndez Echazarreta and grandfather of Justo Sierra Méndez. Justo Sierra O'Reilly, his son-in-law collaborated with him in policy.

References

External links
 
 

1798 births
1872 deaths
Politicians from Campeche City
Governors of Yucatán (state)
Yucatán independence activists